Cardonal (Otomi: ʼMohai) is a town and one of the 84 municipalities of Hidalgo, in central-eastern Mexico.  The municipality covers an area of 462.6 km².

As of 2005, the municipality had a total population of 15,876.

References

Populated places in Hidalgo (state)
Municipalities of Hidalgo (state)